The following are lists of cities in Africa.

Countries

List of cities in Algeria
List of cities in Angola
List of cities in Benin
List of cities in Botswana
List of cities in Burkina Faso
List of cities in Burundi
List of municipalities in Cameroon
List of cities in Cape Verde
List of cities in the Central African Republic
List of cities in Chad
List of cities in the Comoros
List of cities in the Democratic Republic of the Congo
List of cities in the Republic of the Congo
List of cities in Côte d'Ivoire
List of cities in Djibouti
List of cities and towns in Egypt

List of cities in Equatorial Guinea
List of cities in Eritrea
List of cities in Eswatini
List of cities and towns in Ethiopia
List of cities in Gabon
List of cities in the Gambia
List of cities in Ghana
List of cities in Guinea
List of cities in Guinea-Bissau
List of cities in Kenya
List of cities in Lesotho
List of cities in Liberia
List of cities in Libya
List of cities in Madagascar
List of cities in Malawi
List of cities in Mali
List of cities in Mauritania
List of places in Mauritius
List of cities in Morocco
List of cities in Mozambique
List of cities in Namibia
List of cities in Niger
List of cities in Nigeria
List of cities in Rwanda
List of cities in São Tomé and Príncipe
List of cities in Senegal
List of cities in Seychelles
List of cities in Sierra Leone
List of cities in Somalia
List of cities in Somaliland
List of cities in South Africa

List of cities in South Sudan
List of cities in Sudan
List of cities in Tanzania
List of cities in Togo
List of cities in Tunisia
List of cities and towns in Uganda
List of cities in Western Sahara
List of cities in Zambia
List of cities and towns in Zimbabwe

Dependencies and other territories

List of cities in the Canary Islands
List of Spanish cities in Africa
List of cities in Ceuta
List of cities in Madeira
List of cities in Mayotte
List of cities in Melilla
List of cities in Réunion
List of cities in St. Helena
List of cities in Socotra
Azores

Regions
 List of cities in East Africa

See also
 Lists of cities
 Lists of cities by country
 List of urban agglomerations in Africa
 List of cities by continent
 List of cities in North America
 List of cities in South America
 List of cities in Asia
 List of cities in Europe
 List of cities in Oceania
 List of African countries
 Urbanization in Africa
 Metropolitan areas in South Africa
 List of cities in Africa by population
 List of largest cities in Africa (German Wikipedia)

External links
 

Cities
Africa